Black Legend was a British video game publisher predominantly active in the Amiga games market. Founded in Switzerland in 1992 by Richard M. Holmes, it moved to Hertfordshire (St Albans, then Welwyn), England, the following year when it became part of distribution company Kompart. Black Legend found success working with smaller developers, often from ex-Soviet Union countries. Following a stark decline of the Amiga games market in 1994, Black Legend shut down in 1996, followed by its German office in Mülheim an der Ruhr later that year.

History 
Black Legend was founded in 1992 by Richard M. Holmes, at the time 20 years old and residing in Switzerland. The company targeted the games market for Amiga systems, which was largely neglected at the time, while also working on some games for personal computers. Black Legend worked with external developers, mostly small studios with just a handful of people and teams based in ex-Soviet Union countries. Not long into the company's lifetime, Holmes came in contact with Steven Bailey of the British game distribution company Kompart. Bailey visited the Black Legend offices and the two companies subsequently struck a partnership. By August 1993, Black Legend had become a part of Kompart, with Holmes, Bailey and Duncan Lowthian (Bailey's business partner) acting as both companies' joint directors. Through this move, Black Legend became co-located with Kompart in St Albans, England. With Kompart serving distribution, marketing, and public relations, Black Legend could focus solely on the publishing aspect.

By the holiday season of 1993, Black Legend had published four games: Fatman: The Caped Consumer, developed by Hungarian studio I/O Product for Amiga and MS-DOS; Moscow Nights, a collection of Russian-based games for MS-DOS and Microsoft Windows; Hyperion, a low-budget Amiga game developed by Norwegian team Offence Software; and Hungary for Fun, a compilation of games including Kid Pool, Logic, and Zarcan.

In 1994, Black Legend relocated from St Albans to Welwyn and opened a regional office in Mülheim an der Ruhr, Germany, with staff formerly of developer Blue Byte. This office received Black Legend games in shipments from the England headquarters, localised them, and distributed them in Germany. However, by this time, publishers had started moving on from Amiga systems to more relevant systems like the PlayStation; eventually, the Amiga 4000T was the last Amiga model to be released. Kompart realised this in 1995 and consequently decided to close Black Legend, which happened the following year. It was survived by its German office, which published Colony Wars 2492 from Digital X-citement and Five-A-Side Soccer before closing as well later in 1996. Holmes subsequently became the European product manager for Eidos Interactive before founding several other video game companies, such as IncaGold, Play Sunshine, and Lolly.

Games published

References 

1996 disestablishments in England
British companies disestablished in 1996
Defunct companies of Switzerland
Defunct video game companies of the United Kingdom
Swiss companies established in 1992
Video game companies disestablished in 1996
Video game companies established in 1992
Video game publishers